Caleb Powers (February 1, 1869 – July 25, 1932) was a United States representative from Kentucky and the first Secretary of State of Kentucky convicted as an accessory to murder.

Early life
He was born near Williamsburg, Kentucky. He attended the public schools, Union College in Barbourville, Kentucky, the University of Kentucky at Lexington, Kentucky and Centre College in Danville, Kentucky. He graduated from the Northern Indiana Normal School and Business Institute (now known as Valparaiso University) in Valparaiso, Indiana and attended the United States Military Academy in 1890 and 1891.

Powers studied law and was admitted to the bar in 1894 and commenced practice at Barbourville, Kentucky. He was the superintendent of public schools for Knox County, Kentucky 1894-1899. He was elected secretary of state of Kentucky in 1899 but was unseated after a contest.

Assassination of William Goebel
Powers was convicted of complicity in the assassination of Governor William Goebel (D) in 1900 who had just won the election. Goebel was walking to work at the Capitol between two body guards, when assassins opened fire and killed him. The prosecution charged that Powers was the mastermind of having a political opponent killed so that his boss, Governor William S. Taylor (Kentucky politician) (R), could stay in office. Among his attorneys were R. C. O. Benjamin and Frank S. Black. Powers was found guilty and sentenced to prison. But an appeals court overturned Powers' conviction, though Powers was tried three more times, resulting in two convictions and a hung jury. Governor Augustus E. Willson (R) eventually pardoned Powers in 1908 though he had already served eight years in jail. While in prison, Powers authored the 1905 book My Own Story.

Congress and later life
After leaving prison, Powers was elected as a Republican to the 62nd and to the three succeeding Congresses (March 4, 1911 – March 3, 1919) but was not a candidate for renomination in 1918. He served as a delegate to the Republican National Convention in 1912 and moved to Washington, D.C., and served as assistant counsel for the United States Shipping Board from 1921 until his death in Baltimore, Maryland, in 1932. He was buried in City Cemetery, Barbourville, Kentucky.

Caleb Powers married Laura Rawlings in January 1896 and she died six months later. He was survived by his second wife, Dorothy. He had one daughter, named Elsie.

See also

List of wrongful convictions in the United States

References

 
 Secretary of State Caleb Powers  - From the Secretary of State of Kentucky.
 Elliot, R. Assassination at the State House: The Unsolved Mystery of Kentucky's Governor Goebel. McClanahan Publishing House, 1995.
   Aggregated Citations
  Collected Papers
  News article of death
  "COMMONWEALTH OF KENTUCKY v. CALEB POWERS. IN THE MATTER OF THE COMMONWEALTH OF KENTUCKY, COMMONWEALTH OF KENTUCKY"
  GovTrack.us

External links

 
 Caleb Powers papers at the University of Kentucky Libraries Special Collections Research Center

1869 births
1932 deaths
People from Whitley County, Kentucky
Centre College alumni
Valparaiso University alumni
Recipients of American gubernatorial pardons
Secretaries of State of Kentucky
Kentucky politicians convicted of crimes
Overturned convictions in the United States
Republican Party members of the United States House of Representatives from Kentucky